Godal is a surname. Notable people with the surname include:
 Anne Marit Godal (born 1972), Norwegian encyclopedist
 Bjørn Tore Godal (born 1945), Norwegian politician
 Boris Godál (born 1987), Slovak footballer
 Edward Godal, British film producer
 Ingvald Godal (1934–2019), Norwegian politician
 Tom Godal (born 1953), Norwegian motorcycle speedway rider
 Tord Godal (1909–2002), Norwegian theologian and bishop

See also
 

Norwegian-language surnames